The 2019 Canberra Challenger was a professional tennis tournament played on outdoor hard courts. It was the fourth edition of the tournament which was a part of the 2019 ATP Challenger Tour. It took place in Canberra, Australia between 6 and 12 January 2019.

Singles main-draw entrants

Seeds

 1 Rankings are as of December 31, 2018.

Other entrants
The following players received wildcards into the singles main draw:
 Aaron Addison
 Thomas Bosancic
 Tom Evans
 James Frawley
 Bradley Mousley

The following players received entry into the singles main draw using their ITF World Tennis Ranking:
 Marco Bortolotti
 Sadio Doumbia
 Colin Sinclair
 Alexander Zhurbin

The following players received entry into the singles main draw as alternates:
 David Barclay
 Maxime Chazal
 Matthew Romios
 Sem Verbeek

The following players received entry from the qualifying draw:
 Fabrice Martin
 Lucas Vuradin

Champions

Singles

  Hubert Hurkacz def.  Ilya Ivashka 6–4, 4–6, 6–2.

Doubles

  Marcelo Demoliner /  Hugo Nys def.  André Göransson /  Sem Verbeek 3–6, 6–4, [10–3].

2019 ATP Challenger Tour
2019 in Australian tennis
January 2019 sports events in Australia
Canberra Challenger